was a Japanese mathematician.  Above all, he is famous for discovering that every conformal class on a smooth compact manifold is represented by a Riemannian metric of constant scalar curvature. Other notable contributions include his definitive solution of Hilbert's fifth problem.

Life
Hidehiko Yamabe was born on August 22, 1923 in the city of Ashiya, belonging to the Hyōgo Prefecture, the sixth son of Takehiko and Rei Yamabe. After completing the Senior High School in September 1944, he joined Tokyo University as a student of the Department of Mathematics and graduated in September 1947: his doctoral advisor was Shokichi Iyanaga. He was then associated with the Department of Mathematics at Osaka University until June 1956, even  while employed by the Department of Mathematics at Princeton University in Princeton, New Jersey. Shortly before coming to the United States of America, Yamabe married his wife Etsuko, and by 1956 they had two daughters. Yamabe died suddenly of a stroke in November 1960, just months after accepting a full professorship at Northwestern University.

Academic career
After graduating from the University of Tokyo in 1947, Yamabe became an assistant at Osaka University. From 1952 until 1954 he was an assistant at Princeton University, receiving his Ph.D. from Osaka University while at Princeton. He left Princeton in 1954 to become assistant professor at the University of Minnesota. Except for one year as a professor at Osaka University, he stayed in Minnesota until 1960. Yamabe died suddenly of a stroke in November 1960, just months after accepting a full professorship at Northwestern University.

The Yamabe Memorial Lecture and the Yamabe Symposium
After coming back to Japan, Etsuko Yamabe and her daughters lived with the benefits of Hidehiko's social security and of funds raised privately by her and her husband's friends in the United States of America. When she had achieved some financial stability, it was her wish to return the kindness shown to her in a time of great need by setting up funds for an annual lecture, to be alternatively held at Northwestern and Minnesota: the Yamabe Memorial Lecture was so established, and was able to attract distinguished lecturers as Eugenio Calabi. Further funding permitted the expansion of the lecture to the present state bi-annual Yamabe Symposium.

Work

Research activity
Yamabe published eighteen papers on various mathematical topics:. These have been collected and published as a book, edited by Ralph Philip Boas, Jr. for Gordon and Breach Science Publishers.

Half of Yamabe's papers concern  the theory of Lie groups and related topics. However, he is best known today for his remarkable posthumous paper, "On a deformation of Riemannian structures on compact manifolds," Osaka Math. J. 12 (1960) 21–37. This paper claims to prove that any Riemannian metric on any compact manifold without boundary is conformal to  another metric for which the scalar curvature is constant. This assertion, which naturally generalizes the uniformization of Riemann surfaces to arbitrary dimensions,  is completely correct, as is the broad outline  of Yamabe's proof. However, Yamabe's argument contains a subtle analytic mistake arising form  the failure  of certain natural inclusions of Sobolev spaces to be compact. This mistake was only corrected in stages, on a case-by-case basis, first by Trudinger ("Remarks Concerning the Conformal Deformation of Metrics to Constant Scalar Curvature", Ann. Scuola Norm. Sup. Pisa 22 (1968) 265–274), then by Aubin (Équations Différentielles Non Linéaires et Problème de Yamabe, J. Math. Pures Appl. 9: 55 (1976) 269–296), and finally, in full generality,  by Schoen ("Conformal Deformation of a Riemannian Metric to Constant Scalar Curvature,"  Journal of Differential Geometry 20 (1984) 478-495). For example, as of January 16, 2015, MathSciNet records 186 citations of Yamabe's 1960 paper in the Osaka Journal, compared with only 148 citations of all of his other publications combined.
As of January 16, 2015, MathSciNet also lists 997 reviews containing the word "Yamabe." This, of course, is notably larger than the number of papers that  explicitly cite any of Yamabe's articles. However, the vast majority of these reviews contain one of the phrases  "scalar curvature" or "Yamabe equation," referring to Yamabe's equation  governing the behavior of the scalar curvature under conformal rescaling. In this sense, the influence of Yamabe's 1960 paper in the Osaka Journal has become such a universal fixture of current mathematical thought that it is often implicitly referred to without an explicit citation.

Publications

See also
Hilbert's fifth problem
Yamabe flow
Yamabe invariant
Yamabe problem

Notes

References
. Available from Project Euclid.
.
 .
.

External links
 
 

1923 births
1960 deaths
Group theorists
Differential geometers
20th-century Japanese mathematicians
Academic staff of Osaka University
University of Tokyo alumni
Princeton University faculty
Northwestern University faculty
Japanese expatriates in the United States